Picuris (also Picurís) is a language of the Northern Tiwa branch of Tanoan spoken in Picuris Pueblo, New Mexico.

Genealogical relations
Picuris is partially mutually intelligible with Taos dialect, spoken at Taos Pueblo. It is slightly more distantly related to Southern Tiwa (spoken at Isleta Pueblo and Sandia Pueblo).

Phonology

{|class="wikitable" style="text-align: center"
|-
! colspan="2" rowspan="2" |
! rowspan="2" | Bilabial
! colspan="2" | Dental
! rowspan="2" | Alveolar
! rowspan="2" | Palatal
! colspan="2" | Velar
! rowspan="2" | Glottal
|-class=small !
! central
! lateral
!central
!labial
|-
! rowspan="4" | Stop
! voiced
| 
| 
|
|
|
| 
|
|
|-
! voiceless
| 
| 
|
|
| 
| 
|
| 
|-
!aspirated
|
|
|
|
|
|
|
|
|-
!ejective
|
|
|
|
|
|
|()
|
|-
! colspan="2" | Fricative
|
|
| 
|
|
|
|
|
|-
! colspan="2" | Nasal
|
|
|
|
|
|
|
|
|-
! colspan="2" |Approximant
|
|
|
|
|
|
|
|
|-
! colspan="2" |Flap
|
|
|
|
|
|
|
|
|}

 The consonants  are only found in recent Spanish loanwords.
 G. Trager (1942, 1943) analyzed Picuris as also having aspirated stops , ejective stops , and labialized .
 Velar  has strong frication.
 Stops  are unaspirated while  may be slightly aspirated.
 The affricate  freely varies with a more forward articulation : for example, F. Trager recorded the word  "witch" with an initial  but the related word  "witch chief" with initial .
 The sequence  is only found in a single word .
 Alveolar  has an assimilated velar variant  when it precedes labio-velar .
 Nasal  in a low-toned syllable is partially devoiced and denasalized  before a glottal stop , as in  "chokecherry" which is phonetically .
 Fricative  freely varies between a lateral fricative and a central-lateral fricative sequence 
 Lateral  is palatalized  before the high front vowel .
 Only the sonorants  can occur in syllable coda position.

Vowels 
Picuris has 6 vowels. Picuris also has nasalized counterparts for each vowel.

{| class="wikitable" style="text-align: center"
|+ Oral Vowels
!
! Front
! Back
|-
! High
| 
| 
|-
! Upper Mid
| 
| 
|-
! Lower Mid
|
| 
|-
! Low
| colspan="2" | 
|}

Picuris has three degrees of stress: primary, secondary, and unstressed. Stress affects the phonetic length of syllable rimes (lengthening the vowel or the syllable-final sonorant consonant).

Additionally, there are three tones: high, mid, and low — the mid tone being the most frequent.

Text

Two sentences with interlinear glosses:

{| class="wikitable"
! style="text-align: left;" | Picuris:
|  ||  ||  ||  || 
|- style="font-style: italic;"
! style="text-align: left;" | English gloss:
| corn || pumpkins || beans || we.two.will.make || at.going.being-at.Picuris-we.good.dwell
|-
! style="text-align: left;" | Free translation:
| colspan="5" | "Corn, pumpkins, beans, we live happily at Picuris by raising an abundant crop."
|}
{| class="wikitable"
! style="text-align: left;" | Picuris:
|  || 
|- style="font-style: italic;"
! style="text-align: left;" | English gloss:
| you || you.have.the.tail
|-
! style="text-align: left;" | Free translation:
| colspan="2" | "It's your turn."
|}

See also

 Picuris Pueblo
 Tiwa languages

Notes

Bibliography

 Harrington, John P.; & Roberts, Helen. (1928). Picuris children's stories with texts and songs. Bureau of American Ethnology: Annual report, 43, 289-447.
 Nichols, Lynn. (1994). Vowel copy and stress in Northern Tiwa (Picurís and Taos). In S. Epstein et al. (Eds.), Harvard working papers in linguistics (Vol. 4, pp. 133–140).
 Nichols, Lynn. (1995). Referential hierarchies and C-command in Picurís. In S. Epstein et al. (Eds.), Harvard working papers in linguistics (Vol. 45, pp. 76–92).
 Trager, Felicia. (1968). Picuris Pueblo, New Mexico: An ethnolinguistic "salvage" study. (Doctoral dissertation, State University of New York, Buffalo, NY).
 Trager, Felicia. (1971). The phonology of Picuris. International Journal of American Linguistics, 37, 29-33.
 Trager, Felicia. (1975). Morphemic change in Picuris: A case of culture contact? Studies in Linguistics, 25, 89-93.
 Trager, George L. (1942). The historical phonology of the Tiwa languages. Studies in Linguistics, 1 (5), 1-10.
 Trager, George L. (1943). The kinship and status terms of the Tiwa languages. American Anthropologist, 45 (1), 557-571.
 Trager, George L. (1969). Taos and Picuris: How long separated?. International Journal of American Linguistics, 35 (2), 180-182.
 Zaharlick, Ann Marie (Amy). (1975). Pronominal reference in Picurís. Studies in Linguistics, 25, 79-88.
 Zaharlick, Ann Marie (Amy). (1977). Picurís syntax. (Doctoral dissertation, American University).
 Zaharlick, Ann Marie (Amy). (1979). Picuris and English: Similarities and differences. In R. J. Rebert (Ed.), Language descriptions from Indian New Mexico (pp. 20–51). Albuquerque: The University of New Mexico, American Indian Bilingual Education Center, pp.
 Zaharlick, Ann Marie (Amy). (1980). An outline of Picuris syntax. Annals of the New York Academy of Sciences, 345, 147-163.
 Zaharlick, Ann Marie (Amy). (1981). A preliminary examination of tone in Picuris. Special Issue: Native Languages of the Americas. Journal of the Linguistic Association of the Southwest, 4 (2), 123-129.
 Zaharlick, Ann Marie (Amy). (1982). Tanoan studies: Passive sentences in Picuris. Ohio State University Working Papers in Linguistics, 26, 34-48.

External links
 Stress, length, and moraic trochees in Northern Tiwa Picurís

Tanoan languages
Indigenous languages of New Mexico
Indigenous languages of the Southwestern United States
Indigenous languages of the North American Southwest